Brian Oladapo Idowu (born 18 May 1992) is a professional footballer who plays as a left-back for Russian club Khimki. Born in Russia, he represents the Nigeria national team.

Club career
Born in Saint Petersburg to a Nigerian father and a Russian-Nigerian mother, Idowu moved to Owerri, Nigeria at early age, and later moved back to Russia.

He made his Russian Premier League debut for FC Amkar Perm on 6 May 2012 in a game against FC Terek Grozny.

After a loan spell with Dynamo St Petersburg during the 2013–14 season, Idowu signed a new 3-year deal with Amkar on 30 June 2014, extending his contract again in February 2017 until the summer of 2020.

Lokomotiv Moscow
On 10 July 2018, he signed a 3-year contract with FC Lokomotiv Moscow.

Khimki
On 7 August 2020, he joined Khimki on loan for the 2020–21 season.

On 7 June 2021, he moved to Khimki on a permanent basis, signing a 2-year contract with an additional 1-year extension option.

International career
In November 2017, Idowu was called up to the Nigerian national team for their friendly against Argentina in Krasnodar on 14 November 2017. Idowu made his debut against Argentina on 14 November, coming on as a half-time substitute for Ola Aina, and scoring Nigeria's third goal in a 4-2 win.

In May 2018 he was named in Nigeria's preliminary 23-man squad for the 2018 FIFA World Cup in Russia.

Personal life
Idowu's father is Nigerian and his mother is half-Russian, half-Nigerian. He was born and raised in St. Petersburg, except for a period when he was aged 3 to 6 when he lived in Owerri, Nigeria. Idowu speaks perfect Russian and acted as a makeshift translator of the Nigerian national team at news conference ahead of a fixture in Krasnodar in November 2017.

Career statistics

Club

International

International goals

Honours

Club
Lokomotiv Moscow
Russian Cup: 2018–19
 Russian Super Cup: 2019

References

External links

1992 births
Footballers from Saint Petersburg
Citizens of Nigeria through descent
Nigerian people of Russian descent
Russian people of Nigerian descent
Russian people of Yoruba descent
Yoruba sportspeople
Living people
Russian footballers
Nigerian footballers
Nigeria international footballers
Association football defenders
FC Amkar Perm players
FC Dynamo Saint Petersburg players
FC Lokomotiv Moscow players
FC Khimki players
Russian Premier League players
Russian First League players
2018 FIFA World Cup players